Cádiz railway station, is the main railway station of the Spanish city of Cádiz, Andalusia. It served over 1.2 million passengers in 2018, of which 350,000 were Cercanías Cádiz passengers.

Services
Alvia services use the Madrid–Seville high-speed rail line as far as Seville-Santa Justa, and switches to the conventional rail network to serve Jerez and finally Cádiz, and Media Distancia services operate between Cádiz and Jaén and another to Córdoba. The Cercanías Cádiz commuter rail line also serves the station.

References

Railway stations in Andalusia
Buildings and structures in Cádiz